The 1933 Philadelphia Eagles season was the franchise's inaugural season in the National Football League (NFL). The team went 3–5–1, failing to qualify for the playoffs under head coach Lud Wray.

Offseason
When Pennsylvania eased some of the Blue laws and allowed Sunday sporting events, Philadelphia and Pittsburgh became available for NFL franchises as they could play home games on Sundays. The Frankford Yellow Jackets played their games on Saturday mostly when at home.

During the offseason, Bert Bell and Lud Wray were granted an expansion franchise in the NFL for the rights to Philadelphia. The previous team, the Frankford Yellow Jackets, were inactive for two years so their rights were pulled by the NFL. They joined the Pittsburgh Pirates and the Cincinnati Reds, for a $2,500 entrance fee. The Eagles got their name from the Blue Eagle, which was used by American companies to symbolize their compliance with the National Industrial Recovery Act, a program within Franklin D. Roosevelt's New Deal.  The NFL Eagles' original colors were a light blue and yellow.

The Eagles held their first training camp in Atlantic City, New Jersey.  They scheduled their home games to be played at the Baker Bowl in Philadelphia, which was also the home of the Philadelphia Phillies of Major League Baseball.  The Eagles played at the Baker Bowl for three seasons before moving to the newer Philadelphia Municipal Stadium in the south Philadelphia area.

Personnel

Regular season

Schedule

Standings

Playoffs
Before the 1933 season, new Boston Redskins owner George Preston Marshall suggested the league have a championship game yearly. The year before, the Chicago Bears played the Portsmouth Spartans in an extra game to break the tie between them at season's end. They both had 6 wins.

The 3–5–1 Eagles failed to make it to the 1933 NFL Playoffs. It was only between two teams: the winner of the Eastern Division, the New York Giants, and the Western Division, the Chicago Bears.

References

Philadelphia Eagles seasons
Philadelphia Eagles
Philadelphia Eag